Don Elliott Helfman (October 21, 1926 – July 5, 1984) was an American jazz trumpeter, vibraphonist, vocalist, and mellophone player. Elliott recorded over 60 albums and 5,000 advertising jingles throughout his career.

Career
Elliott played mellophone in his high school band and played trumpet for an army band. After studying at the University of Miami he added vibraphone to his instruments. He recorded with Terry Gibbs and Buddy Rich before forming his own band. From 1953 to 1960, he won the DownBeat Readers' Poll several times for "miscellaneous instrument-mellophone."

Known as the "Human Instrument",  Elliott performed jazz as a vocalist, trombonist, flugelhornist, and percussionist. He pioneered the art of multitrack recording, composed prize-winning advertising jingles, prepared film scores, and built a thriving production company. He scored several Broadway productions, including James Thurber's The Beast in Me and A Thurber Carnival, as well as Frank D. Gilroy's The Only Game in Town. He also provided one of the voices for the novelty jazz duo the Nutty Squirrels.

Elliott was a longtime associate of Quincy Jones, contributing vocals to Jones's scores for the films The Pawnbroker (1962), Walk, Don't Run (1966), In the Heat of the Night (1967), $ (1971), The Hot Rock (1972) and The Getaway (1972). Elliot also composed the score to The Happy Hooker starring Lynn Redgrave.

Elliott owned and operated one of the first multitrack recording studios in New York City and in Weston, Connecticut, where he died of cancer in 1984.

Discography

As leader or co-leader
 Vibrations (Savoy, 1956) – with Cal Tjader
 Doubles in Brass (Vanguard, 1954)
 The Don Elliott Quintet (RCA Victor, 1954)
 Mellophone (Bethlehem, 1955)
 Don Elliott Sings (Bethlehem, 1955)
 Counterpoint for Six Valves (Riverside, 1955) – with Rusty Dedrick (also released as Double Trumpet Doings)
 The Voice of Marty Bell - The Quartet of Don Elliott (Riverside, 1956)
 The Bob Corwin Quartet featuring the Trumpet of Don Elliott (Riverside, 1956)
 A Musical Offering (ABC, 1956)
 Don Elliott at the Modern Jazz Room (ABC, 1956)
Eddie Costa, Mat Mathews & Don Elliott at Newport (Verve, 1957)
 The Voices of Don Elliott (ABC, 1957)
 Music for the Sensational Sixties (Design, 1957)
 Jamaica Jazz (ABC-Paramount, 1958)
 The Mello Sound (Decca, 1958)
The Nutty Squirrels (Hanover, 1959) with Alexander "Sascha" Burland
 Mr. Versatile
 Love is a Necessary Evil (Columbia, 1962)
 Rejuvenation ([Columbia, 1975)

As sideman
 1954 Skin Deep, Louie Bellson
 1954 Joe Puma Quintet, Joe Puma
 1955 Songs by Sylvia Syms, Sylvia Syms
 1956 The Swingin' Miss "D", Dinah Washington
 1956 Sylvia Syms Sings, Sylvia Syms
 1956 Desmond: Here I Am, Paul Desmond
 1956 Featuring Don Elliott, Paul Desmond
 1956 Special Delivery, Janet Brace
 1956 Braff!, Ruby Braff
 1957 Swingin' with Terry Gibbs Orchestra & Quartet, Terry Gibbs
 1957 My Fair Lady Loves Jazz Billy Taylor
 1957 Hi-Fi Suite, Leonard Feather
 1958 Sing Me a Swing Song, Bobby Short
 1958 Legrand Jazz, Michel Legrand
 1959 Amor!: The Fabulous Guitar of Luiz Bonfa, Luiz Bonfá
 1959 Porgy & Bess, Mundell Lowe
 1959 The Ivory Hunters, Bob Brookmeyer/Bill Evans
 1958 Connee Boswell Sings Irving Berlin, Connee Boswell
 1964 The Many Faces of Art Farmer, Art Farmer
 1963 The Boss of the Blues, Charles Brown
 1961 Like Tweet, Joe Puma
 1964 Golden Boy, Quincy Jones
 1967 In the Heat of the Night OST, Quincy Jones
 1972 The Hot Rock OST, Quincy Jones
 1973 There Goes Rhymin' Simon, Paul Simon
 1976 I Heard That!, Quincy Jones
 1977 One of a Kind, Dave Grusin
 1996 Verve Jazz Masters 57, George Shearing
 2001 Tenderly: An Informal Session, Bill Evans – recorded 1956 & 1957

References

1926 births
1984 deaths
Musicians from Somerville, New Jersey
People from Weston, Connecticut
Singers from New Jersey
American jazz singers
American jazz trumpeters
American male trumpeters
American jazz vibraphonists
Cool jazz singers
Cool jazz trumpeters
Deaths from cancer in Connecticut
20th-century American singers
20th-century trumpeters
Jazz musicians from Connecticut
20th-century American male singers
American male jazz musicians
Jazz vibraphonists